Catharine of Bourbon (1440 in Liège – 21 May 1469 in Nijmegen) was Duchess of Guelders from 1465-1469 by her marriage to Adolf, Duke of Guelders. She was a daughter of Charles I, Duke of Bourbon and his wife Agnes of Burgundy.

Marriage and issue 
Both before and after his accession to the throne Catharine was on several occasions proposed as a bride for Edward IV of England. The marriage negotiations came to nothing, and  Edward went on to astonish his own people, and the Courts of Europe, by marrying for love Elizabeth Woodville, the daughter of an obscure knight.

On 28 December 1463 in Bruges, she married Adolf II, Duke of Guelders, who succeeded his father Arnold as Duke of Guelders in 1465. Catharine and Adolf had twin children:
 Philippa (1467-1547), who married in 1485 with René II, Duke of Lorraine (1451-1508)
 Charles (1467-1538), who later became Duke of Guelders (1492–1538)

Catharine died in 1469 and was buried in the St. Stephen Church in Nijmegen.

References 
 Wilhelm Karl Prinz von Isenburg and Frank Baron Freytag von Loringhoven: Europäische Stammtafeln. Stammtafeln zur Geschichte der europäischen Staaten, vol. 2, J. A. Stargard, Marburg, 1956, table 30.
 P.H. Scheltema: De St.-Stevenskerk te Nijmegen, in: De Opmerker, vol. 30, issue 37, 14 September 1895, p. 291-292, page 291 and page 292

House of Bourbon
German duchesses
1440 births
1469 deaths
15th-century German women
15th-century German people